The 2015 Vuelta a Burgos was a men's road bicycle race which was held from 4 August to 8 August 2015. It was the 37th edition of the stage race, which was established in 1946. The race was rated as a 2.HC event and forms part of the 2015 UCI Europe Tour.

Teams
A total of 11 teams with 8 riders each will race in the 2015 Vuelta a Burgos: 4 UCI ProTeams, 5 UCI Professional Continental Teams and 2 UCI Continental Teams.

Route

Classification leadership

References

External links

Vuelta a Burgos
Vuelta a Burgos
2015 in Spanish road cycling